Kieran Kentish (born 29 August 1987) is an Anguillan former international footballer who played as a defender.

Career
Kentish began his club career in Anguilla with the Roaring Lions, before moving to the United States in 2007 to play college soccer for John Brown University. Kentish majored in construction management.

Kentish earned three caps for the Anguillan national team between 2004 and 2011, all of which came in FIFA World Cup qualifiers.

References

1987 births
Living people
Anguillan footballers
Anguilla international footballers
Roaring Lions FC players
AFA Senior Male League players
Association football defenders
Anguillan expatriate footballers
Anguillan expatriate sportspeople in the United States
John Brown Golden Eagles men's soccer players
Expatriate soccer players in the United States
People from The Valley, Anguilla